The women's team competition of the synchronized swimming events at the 2011 Pan American Games in Guadalajara were held from October 19 to October 21, at the Scotiabank Aquatics Center. The defending Pan American Champion is the team from the United States.

Seven teams competed, each consisting of eight swimmers. There was only a single round of competition. Each team presented two routines: the technical routine and the free routine. The technical routine consists of twelve required elements, which must be completed in order and within a time of between 2 minutes 35 seconds and 3 minutes 5 seconds. The free routine has no restrictions other than time; this routine must last between 3 minutes 45 seconds and 4 minutes 15 seconds.

Schedule
All times are Central Standard time (UTC-6).

Results

References

Synchronized swimming at the 2011 Pan American Games